UDP-GalNAc:beta-1,3-N-acetylgalactosaminyltransferase 1 is an enzyme that in humans is encoded by the B3GALNT1 gene.

This gene is a member of the beta-1,3-galactosyltransferase (beta3GalT) gene family. This family encodes type II membrane-bound glycoproteins with diverse enzymatic functions using different donor substrates (UDP-galactose and UDP-N-acetylgalactosamine) and different acceptor sugars (N-acetylglucosamine, galactose, N-acetylgalactosamine). The beta3GalT genes are distantly related to the Drosophila Brainiac gene and have the protein coding sequence contained in a single exon. The beta3GalT proteins also contain conserved sequences not found in the beta4GalT or alpha3GalT proteins. The carbohydrate chains synthesized by these enzymes are designated as type 1, whereas beta4GalT enzymes synthesize type 2 carbohydrate chains. The ratio of type 1:type 2 chains changes during embryogenesis. By sequence similarity, the beta3GalT genes fall into at least two groups: beta3GalT4 and 4 other beta3GalT genes (beta3GalT1-3, beta3GalT5). The encoded protein of this gene does not use N-acetylglucosamine as an acceptor sugar at all. Multiple transcript variants that are alternatively spliced in the 5' UTR have been described; they all encode the same protein.

References

External links

Further reading